"Turn the Page" is the first single from Bobby Valentino's second studio album, Special Occasion. The song is produced by Rodney Jerkins.

Charts

References

External links
 "Turn the Page" Music Video

2006 singles
Bobby V songs
Song recordings produced by Rodney Jerkins
Songs written by Rodney Jerkins
Contemporary R&B ballads